Ikanos Communications, Incorporated,  was a provider of semiconductor and software products for use in homes. It was headquartered in Fremont, California. The company’s digital subscriber line, communications processors and other products were used in customer premises equipment from network equipment manufacturers and telecommunications service providers.

History
On December 10, 2001, the founder and chief technology officer of Ikanos, Behrooz Rezvani, announced he was editor of the Institute of Electrical and Electronics Engineers (IEEE) draft standard for Ethernet in the first mile over copper.

On August 24, 2009 Ikanos acquired Conexant's Broadband Access product line for about  $54 million in cash. It also announced an investment of $42 million from Tallwood Venture Capital.

In June 2010, John Quigley replaced Michael Gulett as chief executive (who left in April). He was the fifth CEO in six years.

A U.S. appeals court on May 25, 2012 revived a shareholder lawsuit accusing Ikanos of failing to properly disclose known defects in its semiconductor chips at the time it was conducting a 2006 stock offering.

In August 2015, Ikanos was acquired by Qualcomm Atheros in a deal worth around $47 million, with Qualcomm taking on $20 million of liabilities from Ikanos.
In August 2016 Qualcomm Atheros has closed its recently acquired Ikanos operations.

References

Telecommunications companies established in 1999
Digital subscriber line
Electronics companies of the United States
Companies based in Fremont, California
Fabless semiconductor companies
Technology companies based in the San Francisco Bay Area
1999 establishments in California